Perrée is a French surname. Notable people with the surname include:

 Jean-Baptiste Perrée (1761–1800), French Navy officer
 John Perrée (1913/14–1959), victim of Francis Joseph Huchet
 Louis Perrée (1871–1924), French fencer

See also
 Perrey

French-language surnames